William John Kershaw was a member of the Wisconsin State Senate and the Wisconsin State Assembly.

Kershaw was born in County Antrim in what is now Northern Ireland. During the American Civil War, he served in the Union Army. Afterwards, Kershaw was a member of the Military Order of the Loyal Legion of the United States. He died in 1883.

Political career
Kershaw was a member of the Assembly from 1867 to 1868 and again in 1875. He was a member of the Senate from 1869 to 1870. Additionally, he was a delegate to the 1868 Republican National Convention.

References

People from County Antrim
Irish emigrants to the United States (before 1923)
Republican Party Wisconsin state senators
Republican Party members of the Wisconsin State Assembly
People of Wisconsin in the American Civil War
Union Army soldiers
1883 deaths
Year of birth missing